Eduard Schick (23 February 1906 - 20 November 2000) was a German Roman Catholic bishop. He was bishop of the Roman Catholic Diocese of Fulda from 1974 to 1982.

References

2000 deaths